This article details the Leeds Rhinos rugby league football club's 2010 season. This is the fifteenth season of the Super League era.

Pre Season

World Club Challenge

Super League

Table

Results

Play-offs

Challenge Cup

2010 Squad

2010 Transfers In/Out

Gains

Losses

External links
Leeds Rhinos Website
BBC Sport-Rugby League

Leeds Rhinos seasons
Leeds Rhinos
Rugby